Gaius Licinius Mucianus (fl. 1st century AD) was a Roman general, statesman and writer. He is considered to have played a role behind the scenes in the elevation of Vespasian to the throne.

Life 
His name shows that he had passed by adoption from the gens Mucia to the gens Licinia. Mucianus was sent by Claudius to Armenia with Gnaeus Domitius Corbulo. He was a suffect consul during the reign of Nero, most likely during the years 63 or 64.

Mucianus served as governor of Syria in 67 AD. There he encountered the future emperor Vespasian, who had been sent to Judaea in 66 AD to put down the Jewish revolt. The two were initially on bad terms, but the feud was resolved by the beginning of 69. While after the death of Galba, Mucianus and Vespasian both swore allegiance to Otho, however, at a meeting at Mount Carmel in either May or June 69, Mucianus persuaded Vespasian to take up arms against Vitellius, who had deposed Otho.

At a subsequent council of war held in July at Beirut, it was agreed that Vespasian should stay behind to settle affairs in the East, while Mucianus was given a force consisting of Legio VI Ferrata and vexillationes of 2,600 drawn from each of the other five legions in Syria and Judea. Although a relatively small force, Mucianus expected he would pick up men first from the legions stationed in the Balkans, then from dissident, former praetorians who had supported Otho, and with this larger force engage Vitellius' men waiting for them in northern Italy. However, Marcus Antonius Primus had encouraged the legionnaires under him to revolt against Vitellius, and arrived in northern Italy before Mucianus, where he defeated the enemy forces arrayed there. Instead, Mucianus had to defeat a Dacian invasion of Moesia, who had taken advantage of the absence of the troops Antonius Primus had taken with him. Mucianus reached Rome the day after the death of Vitellius, finding Domitian, Vespasian's son, at head of affairs, but until the arrival of Vespasian the real master of Rome was Mucianus.

Mucianus never wavered in his allegiance to Vespasian, whose favor he retained in spite of his arrogance. He is mentioned in the records of the Arval Brethren in the year 70; Mucianus may have been admitted following Vespasian's entrance to Rome, although Ronald Syme admits that he may have been co-opted in absentia by Galba. He was appointed consul (suffect) for the third time in 72. As no mention is made of Mucianus during the reigns of Titus or Domitian, he probably died during the reign of Vespasian; Syme believes his death happened before 78.

Character 
Tacitus describes the character of Mucianus as follows:

Writings 
A clever writer and historian, Mucianus collected the speeches and letters of Romans of the older republican period, probably including a corpus of proceedings of the Senate (res gesta senatus). He was also the author of a memoir, chiefly dealing with the natural history and geography of the East, a text often quoted by Pliny as the source of miraculous occurrences.

See also
 Licinia gens
 Mucia gens

References

Further reading 
 

1st-century geographers
1st-century historians
1st-century Roman governors of Syria
1st-century Romans
1st-century writers
Ancient Roman generals
Flavian dynasty
Latin historians
Mucianus, Gaius
Roman-era geographers
Roman governors of Syria
Suffect consuls of Imperial Rome
Silver Age Latin writers